Quinhagak Airport , is a public-use airport located two nautical miles (3.7 km) east of the central business district of Quinhagak (also spelled Kwinhagak), a city in the Bethel Census Area of the U.S. state of Alaska. It is also known as Kwinhagak Airport.

Although most U.S. airports use the same three-letter location identifier for the FAA and IATA, this airport is assigned AQH by the FAA and KWN by the IATA. The airport's ICAO identifier is PAQH.

Facilities 
It has one runway designated 12/30 with a gravel surface measuring 4,000 by 75 feet (1,219 x 23 m).

Airlines and destinations

Top destinations

References

External links 
 Resources for this airport:
 
 
 

Airports in the Bethel Census Area, Alaska